Juan de Dios Pintado Leines (born 28 July 1997) is a Uruguayan footballer who plays as a right-back or right winger for Defensor Sporting.

Career

Juventud

Goiás (loan)
on 13 January 2020 Campeonato Brasileiro Série A club Goiás signed Pintado on loan from Juventud.

Career statistics

Club

Notes

References

1997 births
Living people
Uruguayan footballers
Uruguayan expatriate footballers
Association football midfielders
People from Las Piedras, Uruguay
Juventud de Las Piedras players
Goiás Esporte Clube players
Godoy Cruz Antonio Tomba footballers
Uruguayan Primera División players
Campeonato Brasileiro Série A players
Argentine Primera División players
Uruguayan expatriate sportspeople in Brazil
Uruguayan expatriate sportspeople in Argentina
Expatriate footballers in Brazil
Expatriate footballers in Argentina